The Van Duzer Corridor AVA, a sub-appellation of the Willamette Valley AVA located within Polk County, Oregon, in the United States, is an American Viticultural Area approved by the Alcohol and Tobacco Tax and Trade Bureau on December 13, 2018 and  effective January 14, 2019.

The distinguishing features of the Van Duzer Corridor AVA are its topography, climate, and soils.

Topography
Topography is characterized by low elevations and gently rolling hills. The low elevations allow cool breezes to flow relatively unimpeded from the Pacific Ocean, through the Oregon Coast Range, forming a wind corridor gap known as the Van Duzer corridor. The western end of the Van Duzer Corridor wind gap is narrow and squeezed by high elevations to the north and south, leaving little room for viticulture. However, the eastern end of the Van Duzer Corridor wind gap, where the Van Duzer Corridor AVA is located, features the same low elevations and rolling hills as the western portion, with the distinction of having a wider area suitable for vineyards. Within the Van Duzer Corridor AVA, the elevation does not impede the eastward-flowing marine air, allowing higher wind speeds to flow through. In contrast, the surrounding regions all have higher elevations.

Climate
Climate is characterized by consistent high wind speeds and low cumulative growing degree-day (GDD) accumulations. The consistently high winds in the AVA contribute to thicker grape skins, and raise the levels of phenolic compounds in the fruit. In contrast, the wind speeds to the north and south southeast of the AVA are slower. The Van Duzer Corridor has lower GDD accumulations than surrounding regions to the north and southeast, indicating that its temperatures are generally cooler. The cooler temperatures ripen the fruit slowly, creating a longer hang time than for the same grape varietal grown in a region with higher GDD accumulations. The longer hang time contributes to a reduced acidity level.

Soils
Soils are primarily uplifted marine sedimentary loams and silts with alluvial overlay, as well as some uplifted basalt. The soils are typically shallow, well-drained, and have a bedrock of siltstone. The high silt and clay levels in the soils balance the overall pH level of the soil by buffering against a sudden increase or decrease in soil pH. The buffering effect is beneficial to vineyards because it boosts the ability of the soils to maintain a stable pH level. In contrast, the soils immediately outside the northern and western boundaries contain soils from different soil series. Farther north and west, the soils contain higher concentrations of basalt and other volcanic materials. In contrast, east of the Van Duzer Corridor AVA, within the Eola-Amity Hills AVA the soils contain larger amounts of volcanic material than the AVA. Additionally, south of the AVA, the soils contain large concentrations of Ice Age loess, which is not found in the Van Duzer Corridor AVA.

References

External links 
 Van Duzar Corridor AVA

2019 establishments in Oregon
American Viticultural Areas
Geography of Polk County, Oregon
Oregon wine
Willamette Valley